River of Darkness is a 2011 American horror film by director Bruce Koehler. The film features professional wrestling stars Kurt Angle, Kevin Nash, and Sid Eudy (credited as "Psycho Sid Vicious" on the cover art) as well as Ray Lloyd in a minor role.

Plot
When unspeakable evil falls on a quiet river town, sheriff Logan (Kurt Angle) is thrust into a chilling nightmare of death and mayhem. He is confronted with a series of horrific murders, each more vicious than the last, and soon learns of the community's seedy past and the evil that has risen from purgatory to exact revenge on the town.

Cast
 Kurt Angle as Sheriff Will Logan
 Kevin Nash as Jayden Jacobs
 Sid Eudy as Jonah Jacobs
 Bill Hinzman as Harvey Hix
 Bill Laing as Joseph Jacobs
 Alan Rowe Kelly as Mary Rutledge
 Bingo O'Malley as Virgil
 Ray Lloyd as Clark Higgins

References

External links
 

2010s English-language films
2011 horror films
American serial killer films
2011 films
American slasher films
2010s American films